This is an incomplete list of New York State Historic Markers in Ulster County, New York.

Listings County-Wide

(147 Markers)

This list does not include the satirical markers in Ulster County erected by artist Norm Magnusson to resemble official Historic Markers. Such markers are distinguished by official Markers by displaying a map of the continental United States with the words "UNITED STATES" above the map at the top of the sign (official Markers in Ulster County usually display a map of New York State (sometimes with the map placed in between the words "NEW" and "YORK") and at the bottom, displaying the words "EDUCATION DEPARTMENT", aping the "STATE EDUCATION DEPARTMENT" that erects the official Markers. Magnusson's satirical markers further distinguish themselves from official Markers by placing the words "ON THIS SITE STOOD" on the same part of, and the same size as, the part of the sign where the name of the event/place/person(s) that the official Marker commemorates is placed. Magnusson's markers do not represent actual historical events, places or people but are intended to make a political point on issues that Magnusson feels need to be discussed and addressed. For example, in Woodstock, Magnusson erected a marker (at the coordinates 42°02′26.0″N 74°07′10.4″W) "commemorating" a fictitious Patriot called "Rob't Hass" that reads "ON THIS SITE STOOD AMERICAN PATRIOT ROB'T HASS WHO BELIEVED THAT A HEALTHY DEMOCRACY MUST DISCOURAGE APATHY AND RESPECT DISSENT. EDUCATION DEPARTMENT, 2006".

See also

 List of New York State Historic Markers
 National Register of Historic Places listings in Ulster County, New York
 National Register of Historic Places listings in New York
 List of National Historic Landmarks in New York
 Historical Marker Databse for Ulster County

References

Ulster County, New York
Ulster